Tom Marshall is an American lyricist, keyboardist and singer-songwriter best known for his association with Trey Anastasio and the rock band Phish. He has been the primary external lyricist for Phish during their career (1983–2004, 2009–present), with songwriting credits for more than 95 originals. In addition to his songwriting work, Marshall also fronts the rock band Amfibian and hosts the Phish podcast Under the Scales. Marshall is the co-founder of Osiris, a podcast network in partnership with Jambase.

Personal life
Marshall attended Princeton Day School in New Jersey with Anastasio. The duo began writing songs together as early as the eighth grade (the reggae tune "Makisupa Policeman" is often regarded as the duo's first collaboration and the very first Phish original song). Other early collaborations include Bivouac Jaun, a project recorded by Marshall, Anastasio, and their friend Marc Daubert (who occasionally played percussion with Phish in 1984 and wrote the lyrics to their classic "The Curtain With"). Many of the pieces recorded on Bivouac Jaun appeared on The White Tape. Marshall also was instrumental in influencing The Man Who Stepped into Yesterday, a Phish concept album and song cycle about the mystical land of Gamehendge written by Anastasio and used as his senior thesis at Goddard College in 1987.

Marshall, Anastasio, and friends would meet at The Rhombus, a giant piece of art located in a park next to the Institute for Advanced Study in Princeton, New Jersey, and embark on lengthy songwriting sessions. Many characters and locations mentioned in early Phish songs reference these songwriting sessions. In one instance, Marshall wrote the original lyrics to the Gamehendge song "McGrupp and the Watchful Hosemasters" and nailed them to Anastasio's front door. By 1985, Anastasio and Marshall had parted ways as Anastasio became more involved with Phish at the University of Vermont.

Years later in 1989, Marshall apparently heard Phish's Junta album and thought to himself, "these guys really need lyrics." Marshall and Anastasio reunited and began a long songwriting partnership that resulted in over 100 songs over the next fifteen years. Anastasio's 2005 solo album Shine marks the first time since the pre-Junta years that he has not worked with Marshall.

In addition to working closely with Anastasio, Marshall fronts his own band, Amfibian, currently on hiatus.

In the fall of 2010, Marshall collaborated with CT jam band The McLovins to co-write "Cohesive", recorded with Marshall and Anthony Krizan (of Spin Doctors fame) at Krizan's Sonic Boom studios. In mid-November 2010, Marshall joined his longtime friend Trey Anastasio on stage at the historic Richardson Auditorium in Alexander Hall Princeton University bringing them back to their roots.

Marshall has a wife named Lea-Lea, a daughter named Anna and a son named Brodie.

List of songs 
This is an incomplete list of titles whose lyrics Tom Marshall has written or co-written.

Discography
Amfibian Tales (August 2000)
Trampled By Lambs and Pecked by the Dove (with Trey Anastasio) (November 1, 2000)
From the Ether (June 2004)
Skip the Goodbyes (July 2007)

References

External links
Phish.Net FAQ: Tom Marshall
Fans interview Tom Marshall
Amfibian
The McLovins
Osiris Media

Living people
Support staff of Phish
People from Princeton, New Jersey
Place of birth missing (living people)
American male songwriters
Songwriters from New Jersey
Princeton Day School alumni
Year of birth missing (living people)